Kopanaya 2-ya is a rural locality (a sloboda) in Kopanyanskoye Rural Settlement, Olkhovatsky District, Voronezh Oblast, Russia. The population was 90 as of 2010. There are 2 streets.

References 

Rural localities in Olkhovatsky District